Yaakov Yitzchok Ezrachi (born August 1933) is a Rosh Yeshiva at the Mir Yeshiva in Jerusalem.

Biography 
Ezrachi was born in Jerusalem to Yisrael Ezrachi and Hinda the daughter of Baruch Shlom, a graduate of the Knesses Yisrael Yeshiva in Slobodka who served as a rabbi in South Africa and was the grandson of Uri David Apiryon, rabbi of Žagarė in Lithuania and author of the book Apiryon David. He studied at the Mir Yeshiva.

Since 1979, he serves as one of the rosh yeshivas of the Mir Yeshiva, next to Eliezer Yehuda Finkel.

Ezrachi is renowned for his warm and friendly manner, and especially for his support of Kiruv efforts to help the unaffiliated Jews from Russia get in touch with their Jewish heritage.

Ezrachi is also a popular speaker for eulogies of great Torah scholars in Israel. He was a featured speaker at the funeral of Moshe Finkel, Tuvia Goldstein, and many others.

Family 
Ezrachi is a son-in-law of Chaim Leib Shmuelevitz, also a former Rosh Yeshiva at the Mirrer Yeshiva. Ezrachi's brother is Baruch Mordechai Ezrachi, another prominent Haredi rabbi.

References

External links
Audio: Talmudic Lectures by Rabbi Yitzchok Ezrachi
Audio: Rosh Chodesh Elul in Yeshivas Mir (5768)
Video: HaRav Yitzchak Ezrachi delivering a lecture on Sukkos 2009 in Mir Yeshiva  (Part 1, Part 2)
Video: Rabbi Yitzchok Ezrachi dancing with Rabbi Asher Arieli

Haredi rabbis in Israel
Living people
Year of birth missing (living people)
Mir rosh yeshivas